Reuven is a suburb of Johannesburg, South Africa. It is located in Region F of the City of Johannesburg Metropolitan Municipality.

History
It would be proclaimed as suburb on 22 May 1963. Reuven is Hebrew for Robert and is named after Robert Horowitz.

References

Johannesburg Region F